The third season of the television comedy series Mom began airing on November 5, 2015, on CBS in the United States. The season is produced by Chuck Lorre Productions and Warner Bros. Television, with series creators Chuck Lorre, Eddie Gorodetsky and Gemma Baker serving as executive producer.

The series follows Christy Plunkett (Anna Faris), a single mother who—after dealing with her battle with alcoholism and drug addiction—decides to restart her life in Napa, California's wine country working as a waitress at the restaurant Rustic Fig and attending Alcoholics Anonymous meetings. She lives with her mother Bonnie Plunkett (Allison Janney), who is also a recovering drug and alcohol addict, as well as her teenage daughter Violet (Sadie Calvano), who was born when Christy was 16years. Christy also has a younger son Roscoe (Blake Garrett Rosenthal) by her deadbeat ex-husband Baxter (Matt Jones). Other prominent character in the series is the wise Marjorie (Mimi Kennedy), Christy and Bonnie's friend and co-Alcoholics Anonymous member. Jaime Pressly and Beth Hall, who play co-Alcoholics Anonymous members Jill and Wendy, respectively, were upgraded to series regular status for this season. The episodes are usually titled with two odd topics that are mentioned in that episode.

Season three of Mom aired Thursdays in the United States at 9:00 p.m. after Life in Pieces in the fall and The Odd Couple in spring.

The season received positive reviews from critics and Allison Janney was nominated a Primetime Emmy Award for her performance.

Cast

Main
 Anna Faris as Christy Plunkett
 Allison Janney as Bonnie Plunkett
 Sadie Calvano as Violet Plunkett
 Matt Jones as Baxter
 Blake Garrett Rosenthal as Roscoe
 Mimi Kennedy as Marjorie Armstrong-Perugian
 Jaime Pressly as Jill Kendall
 Beth Hall as Wendy Harris

Recurring
 Sara Rue as Candace Hayes
 William Fichtner as Adam Janikowski
 Emily Osment as Jodi Hubbard
 Don McManus as Steve Casper
 Lauri Johnson as Beatrice
 David Krumholtz as Gregory Munchnik
 Amy Hill as Beverly Tarantino
 Octavia Spencer as Regina Tompkins
 French Stewart as Chef Rudy
 Reggie De Leon as Paul
 Courtney Henggeler as Claudia
 Jonny Coyne as Victor Perugian
 Charlie Robinson as Mr. Munson
 Mary Pat Gleason as Mary

Special guest stars
 Ellen Burstyn as Shirley Stabler
 June Squibb as Dottie
 Judy Greer as Michelle
 Linda Lavin as Phyllis Munchnik
 Harry Hamlin as Fred Hayes
 Rosie O'Donnell as Jeanine
 Joe Manganiello as Julian
 Rhea Perlman as Anya Perugian
 Richard Schiff as Robert

Guest stars
 Sonya Eddy as Angela
 Tricia O'Kelley as Mrs. Lippert
 Lamont Thompson as Marcus
 Alec Mapa as Milo
 Jean St. James as Tricia
 David Mattey as Pierre
 Sammy Aaron as Craig
 Sean T. Krishnan as Dr. Patel
 Jesse Luken as Travis Sullivan
 Steven Boyer as Dave
 George Paez as Ramone
 Simon Stilens as Wazka Discor
 Stacey Travis as Deborah
 Nick Toth as Richard Pleppler

Episodes

Reception

Ratings

Critical response
Review aggregator website Rotten Tomatoes reports that 100% of nine critics gave this season a positive review; the average rating is 8.33/10. The season averaged 82 out of 100, based on four critics, on Metacritic, indicating "universal acclaim".

Accolades

References

External links
 Episode recaps at CBS.com
  at Internet Movie Database

Mom (TV series)
2015 American television seasons
2016 American television seasons